David Mooney may refer to:

 Dave Mooney (born 1984), Irish footballer
 David J. Mooney, professor of bioengineering